Kentucky Route 208 (KY 208) is a  state highway in the U.S. state of Kentucky. The highway travels through mostly rural areas of Taylor and Marion counties.

Route description
KY 208 begins at an intersection with US 68/KY 55 (New Lebanon Road) west of Spurlington, within Taylor County. It travels to the east-northeast, concurrent with KY 744. Just over  later, they split. KY 208 travels to the north-northeast and enters Marion County. It travels through Phillipsburg, where it crosses Cloyd Creek. The highway curves to the north-northwest and intersects the western terminus of KY 1157 and the eastern terminus of KY 412 (Calvary Road). It then crosses over the Rolling Fork River and enters Calvary, where it intersects the southern terminus of KY 2744 (Old Calvary Pike). At this intersection, KY 208 begins to head to the west-northwest. It crosses over Pontchartrain Creek, passes Calvary Elementary School, and curves to the north. It crosses over Indian Lick Creek and meets its northern terminus, an intersection with KY 2154 (Veterans Memorial Highway), where the roadway continues into Lebanon as New Calvary Road.

Major intersections

See also

References

0208
Transportation in Taylor County, Kentucky
Transportation in Marion County, Kentucky